Lachlan Shire is a local government area in the Central West region of New South Wales, Australia. The Shire is located adjacent to the Lachlan River, the Lachlan Valley Way and the Broken Hill railway line.

The largest town and council seat is Condobolin.  The Shire also includes the towns and villages of Albert, Burcher, Fifield, Lake Cargelligo, Tottenham and Tullibigeal.

The Mayor of Lachlan Shire Council is Cr. John Medcalf, who is unaligned with any political party.

Heritage listings
The Lachlan Shire has a number of heritage-listed sites, including:
 Condobolin, McDonnell Street: All Saints' Anglican Church, Condobolin

Council

Current composition and election method
Lachlan Shire Council is composed of ten Councillors elected proportionally as five separate wards, each electing two Councillors. All Councillors are elected for a fixed four-year term of office. The Mayor is elected by the Councillors at the first meeting of the council. The most recent election was held on 10 September 2016, and the makeup of the council is as follows:

The current Council, elected in 2016, in order of election by ward, is:

References

External links

 
Local government areas of New South Wales